This is a list of notable French people who were born outside present-day Metropolitan France or Overseas France.

A
 Vincent Aka-Akesse – wrestler, born in  N'zi-Comoé, Côte d'Ivoire
 Manuel Anatol – footballer, born in  Irun, Spain
 Anggun – singer-songwriter, born in  Jakarta, Indonesia

B
 Édouard Balladur – former Prime Minister of France, born in  Izmir, Turkey
 Mansour Bahrami – tennis player, born in  Arak, Iran
 Carla Bruni – model, singer, former first lady of France, born in  Turin, Italy

C
 Jacques Cheminade – politician, born in  Buenos Aires, Argentina
 William Christie – musician, born in  Buffalo, New York, United States
 Carlos Curbelo – footballer, born in  San José de Mayo, Uruguay
 Marie Curie – physicist, chemist, born in  Warsaw, Kingdom of Poland

D
 Vencelas Dabaya – weightlifter, born in  Kumba, Cameroon
 Dalida – singer, born in  Cairo, Egypt
 Fatou Dieng – basketball player, born in  Kayar, Senegal
 Didier Drogba – footballer, born in  Abidjan, Ivory Coast

E
 Patrice Evra – footballer, born in   Dakar, Senegal

F

G
 Greg – cartoonist, born in  Ixelles, Belgium
 Élisabeth Guigou – politician, born in  Marrakesh, French Morocco (now Morocco)

H
 Anne Hidalgo – Mayor of Paris, born in  San Fernando, Spain

I

J
 Eva Joly – politician, born in  Grünerløkka, Oslo, Norway
 Lloyd Jones – ice skater, born in Cardiff, Wales, United Kingdom

K

L
 Pierre Lellouche – politician, born in  Tunis, French Tunisia (now Tunisia)
 Axelle Lemaire – lawyer and former politician, born in  Ottawa, Canada; mother is French

M
 Jean-Luc Mélenchon – politician, born in  Tangier International Zone (now Tangier, Morocco)

N

O

P
 Fleur Pellerin – politician, born in  Seoul, South Korea
 Carlo Ponti – film producer, born in  Magenta, Lombardy, Italy

Q

R
 Ségolène Royal – politician, born in  Dakar, French West Africa (now Senegal)

S
 Igor Stravinsky – composer, born in  Saint Petersburg, Russian Empire (now Russia)

T
 Kenzō Takada – fashion designer, born in  Himeji, Hyōgo, Japan

U

V
 Najat Vallaud-Belkacem – politician, born in  Bni Chiker, Morocco
 Manuel Valls – former Prime Minister of France, born in  Barcelona, Spain

W

X

Y
 Rama Yade – politician, born in  Ouakam, Dakar, Senegal

Z
 Zhang Chongren – artist and sculptor, born in  Xujiahui, Shanghai, China

References

Foreign-born